Killpower (Julius Mullarkey) is a fictional character appearing in American comic books published by Marvel Comics. The character appears primarily in British comic books from Marvel UK. He is the partner of Motormouth and first appeared in Motormouth #1. Killpower was created by Gary Frank and Graham Mark.

Publication history
After his initial appearance in Motormouth, Killpower went on to gain a self-titled limited series. After that, his series and Motormouth's were combined and renamed Motormouth and Killpower, often with Killpower's name appearing handwritten or scrawled below Motormouth's as if an afterthought, possibly as a reference to Motormouth's view of him as being a hanger-on.

He, along with Motormouth, appeared in Paul Cornell's Captain Britain and MI13 in 2009 and then later in the 2014 Revolutionary War miniseries.

Fictional character biography
Killpower is a genetically engineered super-being made by Gena-Sys Labs, secretly a subsidiary of Mys-Tech. He was made by the mad scientist Dr. Oonagh Mullarkey, using both human and animal DNA, as a form of expendable supersoldier, and designed to mature at a rapid rate. He had a childlike mentality, but was not taught any morals and had no understanding of concepts like the value of human life. He took a great interest in guns and other weapons, the bigger the better, but regarded shooting people as a game.

He was used as an operative of Gena-Sys (and through them, Mys-Tech) until he was sent to recover the missing MOPED (Mind Operated PErsonal Dematerialization) unit and encountered its new owner Motormouth. She taught him that killing people was bad... the first he had ever heard of such a notion ...and he broke down crying, thinking of all those he'd killed on his missions. When Motormouth was shot in the throat, Julius used his innate mechanical instincts to repair her with technology, giving her a sonic scream as well as integrating the MOPED device into her body. Motormouth and Killpower then became traveling partners and adventurers. Killpower willingly helped Motormouth accomplish her goals, such as tracking down the creators of the MOPED devices. Killpower is one of the few male sidekicks who work with a heroine, such as S.T.R.I.P.E., Ron Stoppable, and Willie Garvin.

Killpower plays an important role in the 'Mys-Tech Wars' though only his partner remembers the incident.

Later, Killpower, Death's Head, Dark Angel, the Incredible Hulk, and other heroes are kidnapped to take part in brutal gladiatorial games. They continue on far longer than they would because powerful pacifist doctors have been enslaved in order to heal all fighters. Killpower uses his technological skills to help the heroes overthrow the leader of the games and destroy his plans to conquer all reality. Killpower perishes in the final battle but the doctors resurrect him.

Sometime later, he becomes a reserve agent for MI:13. While trying to rescue Faiza Hussain's parents, he is taken hostage by Dracula. However, due to his immunity to magic spells (part of why he was on standby to rescue Hussain's family), he is not under Dracula's control and acts as an undercover agent when MI:13 starts their assault.

When Mys-Tech tried to send all of Britain to Hell, Killpower fought at the Battle of London Bridge and entered Hell to save Harley. The other heroes were unable to rescue him and Killpower was left trapped there, terrified and manipulated by Mephisto into believing his friends did not care enough to get him out. Years of manipulation turned him into a rage-driven, murderous beast who, at Mephisto's urgings, would lead a demonic invasion on Earth. During the battle, Killpower tried to kill Harley in revenge but her sonic scream managed to clear his mind. Realising he'd been made into "a bad man", he allowed Britain's super-soldiers to kill him.

Other versions

Days of Future Past
As detailed in this alternate future,  Killpower is one of the few survivors of the anti-Sentinel front, the Resistance Coordination Execution. He follows the lead of Nigel Orpington-Smythe, a counterpart of R.C.X. Motormouth had been one of the previous victims of a Sentinel attack.

Powers and abilities
Killpower has a combination of human and animal DNA as well as "bio-occult conditioning" provided by Mys-Tech. He possesses enhanced strength, speed, stamina, reflexes, senses, and agility. He was shown shrugging off the impact of 20 tons of debris. He also has an instinctive affinity for all sorts of technology, a "mecha-psychometry" that allows him to use, repair, and rebuild devices that he has never seen before.

Killpower has received training in various forms of combat and the use of numerous firearms.

References

External links

Killpower at the International Catalogue of Superheroes

Killpower: The Early Years at the Big Comic Book DataBase

1993 comics debuts
Fictional characters with superhuman senses
Fictional genetically engineered characters
Marvel Comics hybrids
Marvel Comics characters who can move at superhuman speeds
Marvel Comics characters with superhuman strength
Marvel Comics mutates
Marvel Comics superheroes
Marvel UK characters
Marvel UK titles